The Fergana Challenger is a professional tennis tournament played on outdoor hardcourts. It is currently part of the ATP Challenger Tour and the ITF Women's Circuit. It has been held annually at the Istiklol Tennis Club in Fergana, Uzbekistan, since 2000.

Past finals

Men's singles

Women's singles

Men's doubles

Women's doubles

External links 
 

 
ATP Challenger Tour
ITF Women's World Tennis Tour
Hard court tennis tournaments
Tennis tournaments in Uzbekistan
Recurring sporting events established in 2000
2000 establishments in Uzbekistan